Kerimoğlu may refer to:

 Kerimoğlu, Suluova, village in Amasya Province, Turkey
 Tugay Kerimoğlu, Turkish footballer
 Zeynep Kerimoğlu (born 2003), Turkish women's footballer

Turkish-language surnames
Patronymic surnames
Surnames from given names